Moshok is a rural locality (a selo) and the administrative center of Moshokskoye Rural Settlement, Sudogodsky District, Vladimir Oblast, Russia. The population was 1,133 as of 2010. There are 13 streets.

Geography 
Moshok is located 33 km southeast of Sudogda (the district's administrative centre) by road. Kolchevo is the nearest rural locality.

References 

Rural localities in Sudogodsky District
Sudogodsky Uyezd